Cyclophora lutearia is a moth in the  family Geometridae. It is found in Guinea and Nigeria.

References

Moths described in 1881
lutearia
Moths of Africa